Enora or Énora is a Breton female given name. Notable people with the name include:

 Enora Latuillière (born 1992), French biathlete
 Énora Malagré (born 1980), French columnist and radio and television presenter
 Énora Villard (born 1993), French professional squash player

Breton feminine given names